Benina International Airport  serves Benghazi, Libya. It is located in the borough of Benina, 19 kilometres (12 mi) east of Benghazi, from which it takes its name. The airport is operated by the Civil Aviation and Meteorology Bureau of Libya and is the second largest in the country after Tripoli International Airport. Benina International is also the secondary hub of both Buraq Air and flag carrier, Libyan Airlines. As of 17 July 2014 all flights to the airport were suspended due to fighting in the area.

History

Benina was a Regia Aeronautica airport in 1917.
During World War II the airport was used by Italian 15°Stormo, and after the United States Army Air Forces Ninth Air Force during the Eastern Desert Campaign. Known as Soluch Airfield, it was used by the 376th Bombardment Group, which flew B-24 Liberator heavy bombers from the airfield between 22 February and 6 April 1943. From Benina airport started the US attack on the Ploesti oil refineries in August 1943 with 178 B-24 bombers (called Operation Tidal Wave), after an Italian "Arditi" paratroopers attack that destroyed some Allied aircraft in June 1943.

Once the combat units moved west, it was used as a logistics hub by Air Transport Command. It functioned as a stopover en route to Payne Field near Cairo or to Mellaha Field near Tripoli on the North African Cairo-Dakar transport route for cargo, transiting aircraft and personnel.

A new terminal with a capacity of 5 million passengers was to be developed north of the existing runway at Benina International under a 720 million LYD (€415 million) first-stage contract awarded to Canada's SNC-Lavalin as of 2008. The final cost was estimated at 1.1 billion LYD (€630 million). As with Tripoli International Airport, the new terminal was designed by Aéroports de Paris Engineering.  Preliminary work and site preparation had started as of May 2008, but it remains unclear when the terminal will be open for operation. The contract for Benina International Airport included construction of a new international terminal, runway, and apron. The new airport would have been part of an extensive new infrastructure programme being undertaken by the government of Libya throughout the country.

In , forces loyal to Muammar Gaddafi bombed the airport. No damages were reported to facilities.

The airport was closed on 16 May 2014, due to clashes in the area between militias and forces loyal to General Khalifa Haftar. As of 1 August 2014, international airlines had suspended all flights to Libya. As of 5 August 2015, the airport was closed to passenger traffic.

On 15 July 2017, the airport was reopened for commercial flights after three-years of closure due to fighting in Benghazi.

Military use
According to reporting in Le Monde, French special forces have operated out of Benina airport.

Airlines and destinations

Accidents and incidents
On 4 April 1943, Lady Be Good, a World War II B-24 Liberator based at Soluch Field, missed the airport while returning from a bombing mission in Italy.  It crashed in the Libyan Desert 434 miles (699 km) southeast of Soluch Field and was lost for 15 years.
On 9 August 1958, Central African Airways Flight 890, a Vickers Viscount registration VP-YNE, crashed 9 kilometres (5.6 mi) south east of Benina International Airport, killing 36 of the 54 people on board.

See also
Transport in Libya
List of airports in Libya

References

External links

OurAirports - Benina Airport

Airports in Libya
Buildings and structures in Benghazi
Cyrenaica
Airfields of the United States Army Air Forces Air Transport Command in North Africa
World War II airfields in Libya
Airfields of the United States Army Air Forces in Libya